L - Part one of L.O.V.E is the first EP in Sofia Talvik's four album saga, and was released 2011. Along with three new songs, the album includes a new performance of "Ghosts", which originally appeared on Blue Moon.

Track listing
Nothing Quite So Gentle  4:24
Bittersweet Bliss  3:24
Everyone's Favorite Concubine  4:05
Ghosts  2:54

References
L - Part one of L.O.V.E information

2011 EPs
Sofia Talvik albums